The 1st constituency of Bouches-du-Rhône is a French legislative constituency in Bouches-du-Rhône.

Deputies

Elections

2022

 
 
 
 
 
 
 
|-
| colspan="8" bgcolor="#E9E9E9"|
|-

2017

2012

|- style="background-color:#E9E9E9;text-align:center;"
! colspan="2" rowspan="2" style="text-align:left;" | Candidate
! rowspan="2" colspan="2" style="text-align:left;" | Party
! colspan="2" | 1st round
! colspan="2" | 2nd round
|- style="background-color:#E9E9E9;text-align:center;"
! width="75" | Votes
! width="30" | %
! width="75" | Votes
! width="30" | %
|-
| style="background-color:" |
| style="text-align:left;" | Valérie Boyer
| style="text-align:left;" | Union for a Popular Movement
| UMP
| 
| 26.14%
| 
| 50.65%
|-
| style="background-color:" |
| style="text-align:left;" | Christophe Masse
| style="text-align:left;" | Socialist Party
| PS
| 
| 32.04%
| 
| 49.35%
|-
| style="background-color:" |
| style="text-align:left;" | Elisabeth Philippe
| style="text-align:left;" | National Front
| FN
| 
| 21.88%
| colspan="2" style="text-align:left;" |
|-
| style="background-color:" |
| style="text-align:left;" | Robert Assante
| style="text-align:left;" | Miscellaneous Right
| DVD
| 
| 7.26%
| colspan="2" style="text-align:left;" |
|-
| style="background-color:" |
| style="text-align:left;" | Catherine Bartoli
| style="text-align:left;" | Left Front
| FG
| 
| 5.77%
| colspan="2" style="text-align:left;" |
|-
| style="background-color:" |
| style="text-align:left;" | Laurence Vichnievsky
| style="text-align:left;" | The Greens
| VEC
| 
| 2.57%
| colspan="2" style="text-align:left;" |
|-
| style="background-color:" |
| style="text-align:left;" | Mohamed Dahmani
| style="text-align:left;" | Other
| AUT
| 
| 1.16%
| colspan="2" style="text-align:left;" |
|-
| style="background-color:" |
| style="text-align:left;" | Nathalie Coullet
| style="text-align:left;" | 
| CEN
| 
| 0.90%
| colspan="2" style="text-align:left;" |
|-
| style="background-color:" |
| style="text-align:left;" | Véronique Gomez
| style="text-align:left;" | Far Right
| EXD
| 
| 0.78%
| colspan="2" style="text-align:left;" |
|-
| style="background-color:" |
| style="text-align:left;" | Paul Roudier
| style="text-align:left;" | Miscellaneous Right
| DVD
| 
| 0.44%
| colspan="2" style="text-align:left;" |
|-
| style="background-color:" |
| style="text-align:left;" | Eve Koulayan
| style="text-align:left;" | Ecologist
| ECO
| 
| 0.37%
| colspan="2" style="text-align:left;" |
|-
| style="background-color:" |
| style="text-align:left;" | Alain Persia
| style="text-align:left;" | Other
| AUT
| 
| 0.31%
| colspan="2" style="text-align:left;" |
|-
| style="background-color:" |
| style="text-align:left;" | Marc Cecon
| style="text-align:left;" | Far Left
| EXG
| 
| 0.20%
| colspan="2" style="text-align:left;" |
|-
| style="background-color:" |
| style="text-align:left;" | Nicole Bareau
| style="text-align:left;" | Far Left
| EXG
| 
| 0.19%
| colspan="2" style="text-align:left;" |
|-
| style="background-color:" |
| style="text-align:left;" | Sophie Hairabedian
| style="text-align:left;" | Far Right
| EXD
| 
| 0.00%
| colspan="2" style="text-align:left;" |
|-
| colspan="8" style="background-color:#E9E9E9;"|
|- style="font-weight:bold"
| colspan="4" style="text-align:left;" | Total
| 
| 100%
| 
| 100%
|-
| colspan="8" style="background-color:#E9E9E9;"|
|-
| colspan="4" style="text-align:left;" | Registered voters
| 
| style="background-color:#E9E9E9;"|
| 
| style="background-color:#E9E9E9;"|
|-
| colspan="4" style="text-align:left;" | Blank/Void ballots
| 
| 0.82%
| 
| 3.40%
|-
| colspan="4" style="text-align:left;" | Turnout
| 
| 57.35%
| 
| 54.47%
|-
| colspan="4" style="text-align:left;" | Abstentions
| 
| 42.65%
| 
| 45.53%
|-
| colspan="8" style="background-color:#E9E9E9;"|
|- style="font-weight:bold"
| colspan="6" style="text-align:left;" | Result
| colspan="2" style="background-color:" | UMP HOLD
|}

2007

|- style="background-color:#E9E9E9;text-align:center;"
! colspan="2" rowspan="2" style="text-align:left;" | Candidate
! rowspan="2" colspan="2" style="text-align:left;" | Party
! colspan="2" | 1st round
! colspan="2" | 2nd round
|- style="background-color:#E9E9E9;text-align:center;"
! width="75" | Votes
! width="30" | %
! width="75" | Votes
! width="30" | %
|-
| style="background-color:" |
| style="text-align:left;" | Roland Blum
| style="text-align:left;" | Union for a Popular Movement
| UMP
| 
| 47.82%
| 
| 56.96%
|-
| style="background-color:" |
| style="text-align:left;" | Marie-Arlette Carlotti
| style="text-align:left;" | Socialist Party
| PS
| 
| 24.55%
| 
| 43.04%
|-
| style="background-color:" |
| style="text-align:left;" | Childéric Jérôm Muller
| style="text-align:left;" | Democratic Movement
| MoDem
| 
| 6.69%
| colspan="2" style="text-align:left;" |
|-
| style="background-color:" |
| style="text-align:left;" | Marie-Claude Aucouturier
| style="text-align:left;" | National Front
| FN
| 
| 6.68%
| colspan="2" style="text-align:left;" |
|-
| style="background-color:" |
| style="text-align:left;" | Maruja Otero
| style="text-align:left;" | Communist
| COM
| 
| 3.95%
| colspan="2" style="text-align:left;" |
|-
| style="background-color:" |
| style="text-align:left;" | Frédéric Falzon
| style="text-align:left;" | Far Left
| EXG
| 
| 2.91%
| colspan="2" style="text-align:left;" |
|-
| style="background-color:" |
| style="text-align:left;" | Pierre Semeriva
| style="text-align:left;" | The Greens
| VEC
| 
| 2.49%
| colspan="2" style="text-align:left;" |
|-
| style="background-color:" |
| style="text-align:left;" | Eric Talles
| style="text-align:left;" | Ecologist
| ECO
| 
| 1.41%
| colspan="2" style="text-align:left;" |
|-
| style="background-color:" |
| style="text-align:left;" | Olivier Jerez
| style="text-align:left;" | Movement for France
| MPF
| 
| 0.95%
| colspan="2" style="text-align:left;" |
|-
| style="background-color:" |
| style="text-align:left;" | Guy Jullien
| style="text-align:left;" | Miscellaneous Right
| DVD
| 
| 0.66%
| colspan="2" style="text-align:left;" |
|-
| style="background-color:" |
| style="text-align:left;" | Marc Cecon
| style="text-align:left;" | Far Left
| EXG
| 
| 0.55%
| colspan="2" style="text-align:left;" |
|-
| style="background-color:" |
| style="text-align:left;" | Mireille Haas
| style="text-align:left;" | Far Right
| EXD
| 
| 0.47%
| colspan="2" style="text-align:left;" |
|-
| style="background-color:" |
| style="text-align:left;" | Corine Raynaud
| style="text-align:left;" | Far Left
| EXG
| 
| 0.46%
| colspan="2" style="text-align:left;" |
|-
| style="background-color:" |
| style="text-align:left;" | Martine Pentz
| style="text-align:left;" | Divers
| DIV
| 
| 0.40%
| colspan="2" style="text-align:left;" |
|-
| style="background-color:" |
| style="text-align:left;" | Valérie Bellaire
| style="text-align:left;" | Divers
| DIV
| 
| 0.00%
| colspan="2" style="text-align:left;" |
|-
| colspan="8" style="background-color:#E9E9E9;"|
|- style="font-weight:bold"
| colspan="4" style="text-align:left;" | Total
| 
| 100%
| 
| 100%
|-
| colspan="8" style="background-color:#E9E9E9;"|
|-
| colspan="4" style="text-align:left;" | Registered voters
| 
| style="background-color:#E9E9E9;"|
| 
| style="background-color:#E9E9E9;"|
|-
| colspan="4" style="text-align:left;" | Blank/Void ballots
| 
| 1.13%
| 
| 2.71%
|-
| colspan="4" style="text-align:left;" | Turnout
| 
| 58.68%
| 
| 55.81%
|-
| colspan="4" style="text-align:left;" | Abstentions
| 
| 41.32%
| 
| 44.19%
|-
| colspan="8" style="background-color:#E9E9E9;"|
|- style="font-weight:bold"
| colspan="6" style="text-align:left;" | Result
| colspan="2" style="background-color:" | UMP HOLD
|}

2002

 
 
 
 
 
|-
| colspan="8" bgcolor="#E9E9E9"|
|-

1997

 
 
 
 
 
 
|-
| colspan="8" bgcolor="#E9E9E9"|
|-

References

1